Abigail Kawānanakoa is the name of:

 Abigail Campbell Kawānanakoa (1882–1945), Hawaiʻian princess
 Abigail Kapiolani Kawānanakoa (1903–1961), Hawaiʻian princess and daughter of Abigail Campbell Kawānanakoa
 Abigail Kinoiki Kekaulike Kawānanakoa (1926–2022), Hawaiʻian princess and granddaughter of Abigail Campbell Kawānanakoa